Bala James Ngilari is a Nigerian lawyer and former  governor of Adamawa State, Nigeria from October 1, 2014 to May 29, 2015. He was the deputy Governor from 2012 - 2015 under Murtala Nyako  He was succeeded by Bindo Jibrilla, the winner of the 2015 Adamawa gubernatorial election. Ngilari was sentenced to five years in jail without option of fine by a Yola High court for corruption, but was soon afterward acquitted and freed by the Court of Appeals.

References

Living people
Governors of Adamawa State
Year of birth missing (living people)